Shadowman is a 2005 solo album by Steve Walsh.

Track listing
"Rise"  – 5:15
"Shadowman"  – 6:44
"Davey and the Stone That Rolled Away"  – 5:54
"Keep On Knockin"  – 5:53
"Pages of Old"  – 4:54
"Hell is Full of Heroes"  – 6:03
"After"  – 9:58
"The River"  – 4:13
"Faule dr Roane"  – 8:12 (2007 re-release bonus track)
"Dark Day"  – 5:36 (2007 re-release bonus track)

Personnel
Steve Walsh - keyboards, vocals
Joel Kosche - guitars, bass
Joe Franco - drums, electronic percussion
Michael Romeo - giga symphony
David Ragsdale - violin on "After" & "Dark Day"
Matt Still - percussion on "Pages of Old"

References
https://www.therecordlabel.net/progressive-rock/steve-walsh/shadowman/

2005 albums
Steve Walsh (musician) albums
33rd Street Records albums